This is a list of notable Cuban Americans, including immigrants who obtained American citizenship and their American descendants.

Athletes

Aric Almirola, current NASCAR driver, father born in Cuba
Kiko Alonso, current NFL player for the Miami Dolphins, father is Cuban-born
Osvaldo Alonso, midfielder for Minnesota United soccer team, Cuban-born
Carlos Alvarez, former college football player for the University of Florida, known as "The Cuban Comet", Cuban-born
Robert Andino, infielder for the Baltimore Orioles, Cuban-born
Gilbert Arenas, professional basketball player with the Washington Wizards, great-grandfather is Cuban-born
Javier Arenas, cornerback and punt returner for the Arizona Cardinals
J. P. Arencibia, current catcher for the Toronto Blue Jays, parents are Cuban-born
Anthony Leon former NBA ALL-Star center
René Arocha, former MLB pitcher, Cuban-born
Rolando Arrojo, former MLB pitcher, Cuban-born
Bronson Arroyo, starting pitcher for the Arizona Diamondbacks and member of World Champion 2004 Boston Red Sox; Cuban father
Alex Avila, current catcher for the Detroit Tigers, father is Cuban-born
Danys Báez, relief pitcher for the Philadelphia Phillies, Cuban-born
Zach Banks, racing driver, mother is Cuban-born
Yan Barthelemí, Cuban-born professional boxer
Steve Bellán, former baseball player, Cuban-born
Yuniesky Betancourt, former MLB pitcher, Cuban-born
Bert Campaneris, former MLB All-Star shortstop, Cuban-born
Bárbaro Cañizares, current first baseman, Cuban-born
José Canseco, former MLB All-Star outfielder and DH; author (Juiced); reality show contestant (The Surreal Life), Cuban-born
Ozzie Canseco, former MLB outfielder, Cuban-born
José Raúl Capablanca, world chess champion from 1921 to 1927 
Rene Capo, former Olympic judoka
José Cardenal, former MLB outfielder and coach, Cuban-born
John Carlos, Olympic track and field medalist, professional football player, founding member of the Olympic Project for Human Rights; Cuban mother
Joel Casamayor, Cuban professional boxer
Nick Castellanos, Detroit Tigers
Elieser Castillo, Cuban professional boxer
Eliseo Castillo, Cuban professional boxer
Yoenis Céspedes, outfielder with the New York Mets, Cuban-born
Aroldis Chapman, relief pitcher for the New York Yankees, Cuban-born
Vinnie Chulk, relief pitcher for the San Francisco Giants
José Contreras, current MLB free agent pitcher, Cuban-born
Mike Cuellar, former MLB All-Star pitcher, Cuban-born
Orestes Destrade, former MLB first baseman and current broadcaster, Cuban-born
Eric Eichmann, former US National Team and American professional soccer player; Cuban mother
Yunel Escobar, current shortstop for the Los Angeles Angels, Cuban-born
Alex Fernandez, former pitcher for the Florida Marlins
Mary Joe Fernández, tennis player
Osvaldo Fernández, former MLB pitcher for the Cincinnati Reds, Cuban-born
José Fernandez, former MLB pitcher for the Miami Marlins, Cuban-born
Tony Fossas, former MLB relief pitcher, Cuban-born
Ryan Freel, former MLB utility player
Tito Fuentes, former MLB second baseman, Cuban-born
Yuriorkis Gamboa, "El Ciclón de Guantanamo", professional boxer
Danny Garcia, former MLB outfielder, Kansas City Royals
Preston Gómez, former MLB infielder and manager, Cuban-born
Anthony Gonzalez, WR Atlanta Falcons National Football League
Gio González, current MLB pitcher for the Washington Nationals
Joaquin Gonzalez, offensive line, Indianapolis Colts, National Football League
Luis Gonzalez, former outfielder for the Arizona Diamondbacks
Yasmani Grandal, current catcher for the Chicago White Sox, Cuban-born
Sammy Guevara, professional wrestler
Henry Gutierrez, former US National Team and American professional soccer player
Ricky Gutiérrez, former shortstop
Annia Hatch, originally Annia Portuondo; Cuban-American gymnast, former member of Cuban and U.S. National gymnastics teams; 1993 World Gymnastics Championships and 1995 Pan American Games medal winner (representing Cuba); 2004 Olympics medal winner (representing USA); U.S. Classic winner
Enrique Hernández, infielder/outfielder for the Los Angeles Dodgers; Cuban mother
Evelio Hernández, starting pitcher for the Washington Senators, Cuban-born
James "Chico" Hernandez, of Wheaties fame; US Sombo Wrestling Champion; World Cup silver; three-time British silver medalist
Liván Hernández, former MLB pitcher, Cuban-born
Orlando Hernández,  "El Dueque" (The Duke) half-brother of Liván, former MLB player, Cuban-born
Eric Hosmer, first baseman for the Kansas City Royals
Raúl Ibañez, left fielder for the Los Angeles Angels of Anaheim
José Iglesias, current MLB shortstop for the Detroit Tigers, Cuban-born
Jon Jay, outfielder for the Chicago Cubs
 Shiloh Keo, football safety; Cuban mother. 
Danell Leyva, Olympic gymnast
Ryan Lochte, gold medal Olympic swimmer
Doug Logan, chief executive officer of USA Track & Field, the national governing body for track and field, long-distance running, and race walking
Neil Lomax, former quarterback for the St. Louis Cardinals
Hector Lombard, mixed martial artist; Judo competitor at 2000 Sydney Olympics
Brook Lopez, current NBA player for the Milwaukee Bucks; Cuban father
Mickey Lopez, former second baseman
Robin Lopez, current NBA player for the Milwaukee Bucks; Cuban father

Frank Martin, current head men's basketball coach at South Carolina
J. D. Martinez, current MLB player
 Jorge Masvidal, mixed martial artist
Christina McHale, professional women's tennis player
Minnie Miñoso, former MLB All-Star outfielder, Cuban-born
Frank Mir, mixed martial artist and former UFC Heavyweight Champion
Al Montoya, current goalkeeper for the Winnipeg Jets of the NHL
Pablo Morales, Olympic swimmer
Kendrys Morales, current first baseman for the Toronto Blue Jays, Cuban-born
Alex Ochoa, former MLB outfielder and current first base coach in the Boston Red Sox organization
Sergio Oliva, former 3-time Mr. Olympia; only bodybuilder to have ever beaten Arnold Schwarzenegger in a Mr. Olympia competition
Tony Oliva, former MLB All-Star outfielder, Cuban-born
Rey Ordóñez, former shortstop, New York Mets, Cuban-born
Henry Owens, former relief pitcher for the Florida Marlins
Ferdie Pacheco, physician for Muhammad Ali, boxing commentator 
Orlando Palmeiro, former MLB outfielder and pinch-hitter
Rafael Palmeiro, former MLB All-Star first baseman and member of the 3,000 Hit and 500 Home Run clubs, Cuban-born
Camilo Pascual, former MLB pitcher, Cuban-born
Brayan Peña, current MLB catcher, Cuban-born
Eduardo Pérez, former MLB first baseman and current bench coach of the Houston Astros
Tony Pérez, MLB Hall of Fame first baseman and third baseman, Cuban-born
Jorge Posada, catcher for the New York Yankees; Cuban father
Yasiel Puig, MLB outfielder, Cuban-born
Alexei Ramírez, current shortstop for the Chicago White Sox, Cuban-born
Nap Reyes, former MLB infielder, Cuban-born
Guillermo Rigondeaux, Cuban professional boxer
Amy Rodriguez, frontline for U.S. women's national soccer team
Jennifer Rodriguez, Olympic medal-winning speed skater
Sean Rodriguez, second baseman for the Tampa Bay Rays

Cookie Rojas, former MLB infielder and manager, Cuban-born
Yoel Romero, mixed martial artist
Cody Runnels, professional wrestler known by his ring names Cody Rhodes and Stardust; Cuban maternal grandfather
Alberto Salazar, runner, marathon winner, and coach until he was banned
Alex Sánchez, former outfielder, Cuban-born
David Segui, former MLB first baseman
Havana Solaun, former member of the U.S. women's national under-17 soccer team who now represents Jamaica; Cuban paternal grandparents
Odlanier Solís, Cuban professional boxer
Danny Tartabull, former MLB All-Star outfielder
Tony Taylor, former MLB infielder, Cuban-born
Luis Tiant, former MLB All-Star pitcher, Cuban-born
Dara Torres, Olympic gold-medalist swimmer (1984, 1988, 1992, 2000, 2008)
Danny Valencia, American-Israeli MLB and Team Israel third baseman

Priscilla Zuniga, professional wrestler known by her ring names Angel Rose and Diamante

Business

Raúl Alarcón, president and CEO of the Spanish Broadcasting System
Alfredo Alonso, SVP of Clear Channel Radio
Ralph Alvarez, former president and COO of McDonald's
Bacardi family, owners of Bacardi Rums, Grey Goose, Martini & Rossi and Dewar's
Mario Baeza, Cuban-American corporate lawyer, investment and merchant banker, entrepreneur, musician/composer and philanthropist
Charles "Bebe" Rebozo, banker, close confidant of President Richard Nixon; key Watergate scandal figure
Jorge Mas Canosa, founder and CEO of MasTec, political activist, former head of Cuban-American National Foundation
Paul L. Cejas, CEO of PLC Investments, Inc.
Mauricio Claver-Carone, lawyer and president of the Inter-American Development Bank
Carlos de la Cruz, Cuban-born American businessman, the chairman of CC1 Companies, Inc. which include Coca-Cola Puerto Rico Bottlers, CC1 Beer Distributors, Inc., Coca-Cola Bottlers Trinidad & Tobago, and Florida Caribbean Distillers, LLC. The companies together employ 2,500 people and have annual sales of $1 billion
Ralph de la Vega, former president and CEO of AT&T Mobility
Alfonso Fanjul Sr. (1909–1980), Cuban-born American sugar baron
Alfonso Fanjul Jr., sugar baron
Jose Fanjul, sugar baron
Joe Fernandez, entrepreneur, founder of Klout
Raul J. Fernandez, co-owner of the NBA Washington Wizards, NHL Washington Capitals and WNBA Washington Mystics
Jorge Figueredo, Senior Vice President of Dow Jones
Ella Fontanals-Cisneros, Cuban-born art collector and the founder and president of the Cisneros Fontanals Art Foundation

Roberto C. Goizueta, former CEO of the Coca-Cola Company
Sara Del Carmen Jofre González (1934-2008), President and CEO of the Georgia Hispanic Chamber of Commerce (1996–2008)
Nelson Gonzalez, co-founder of Alienware
Efraim Grinberg, CEO of Movado watches
Gedalio Grinberg, founder and former CEO of Movado watches
Carlos Gutierrez, former CEO of Kellogg Company
Armando Gutierrez,  Cuban-born American banker, political consultant, and entrepreneur
Bobby Maduro, baseball entrepreneur; owner of Havana Sugar Kings
Alex Meruelo, CEO of the Muruelo Group
Alvaro de Molina, Chief Financial Officer of Bank of America Corporation
Antonio Luis Navarro, former vice president of W. R. Grace and Company
Jesús Permuy, architect, urban planner, and human rights advocate
Joe Quesada, CCO of Marvel Entertainment; former editor-in-chief of Marvel Comics
George Reyes, Chief Financial Officer of Google
Marcos A. Rodriguez, entrepreneur, broadcaster, movie producer
Felix Sabates, entrepreneur, philanthropist, holds ownership in NASCAR, Charlotte Bobcats
Ralph Sanchez, autoracing promoter, developer, responsible for Grand Prix of Miami and Homestead-Miami Speedway
Alberto Vilar, a.k.a. Albert Vilar, American former investment manager who became particularly known for donating tens of millions as a patron of opera

Education

 Alejandro Anreus, art historian and curator, William Patterson University
 Ruth Behar, anthropologist, poet, and filmmaker; first Latina recipient of a MacArthur award, University of Michigan
 George J. Borjas, Robert W. Scrivner Professor of Economics and Social Policy, Harvard University
 Ana Mari Cauce, President of the University of Washington, Seattle
 Frederick A. de Armas, Andrew W. Mellon Distinguished Service Professor in Romance Languages and Literatures and Comparative Literature University of Chicago
 Miguel A. De La Torre, prolific author on Hispanic religiosity, Iliff School of Theology
 Jorge I. Dominguez, Antonio Madero Professor of Mexican and Latin American Politics and Economics, former Chairman of the Harvard Academy for International and Area Studies, Harvard University
 Roberto González Echevarría, Sterling Professor of Hispanic and Comparative Literature, Yale University
 Carlos M. N. Eire, T. Lawrason Riggs Professor of History and Religious Studies at Yale University; his memoir of the Cuban Revolution, Waiting for Snow in Havana (Free Press, 2003), won the National Book Award for non-fiction
 Maria Cristina Garcia, Howard A. Newman Professor of American Studies at Cornell University; historian of immigration
 Jorge J. E. Gracia, Samuel P. Capen Chair in Philosophy, University at Buffalo
 Robert Lima, Knight Commander, Order of Queen Isabel of Spain; academician ANLE; Corr. Member RAE; Emeritus Professor and Emeritus Fellow, IAH (Penn State University)
 Modesto A. Maidique, former President of Florida International University
 Juan A. Martínez, Florida International University
 Miguel Martinez-Saenz, President of St. Francis College in Brooklyn, NY
 Elsa A. Murano, Former President of Texas A&M University, Former Vice Chancellor of Agriculture & Life Sciences of Texas A&M University, current Director of the Norman E. Borlaug Institute for International Agriculture of Texas A&M University
 Eduardo J. Padrón, President of Miami Dade College, immediate past chair of the board of directors of the American Council on Education (ACE)
 Luis G Pedraja, President Quinsigamond Community College, educator, philosopher and theologian
 Gustavo Pérez Firmat, David Feinson Professor in the Humanities, Columbia University
 Alejandro Portes, Professor of Sociology, Director of the Center for Migration and Development, Princeton University
 Gregory Rabassa, literary translator and Distinguished Professor in the Department of Languages and Literatures at Queens College, City University of New York and in the Ph.D. Program in Hispanic and Luso-Brazilian Literatures of the Graduate School and University Center of the CUNY Graduate Center
 Carmen Reinhart, Minos A. Zombanakis Professor of the International Financial System, Harvard Kennedy School
 Teofilo Ruiz, Distinguished Professor of History, UCLA and recipient of the National Humanities Medal at the White House 
 Rubén G. Rumbaut, Professor of Sociology, University of California, Irvine
 Ernest Sosa, Board of Governors Professor of Philosophy, Rutgers University
 María de los Angeles Torres, LAS Distinguished Professor of Latin American and Latino Studies, University of Illinois at Chicago
 Ricardo Viera, LeHigh University
 Armando Vilaseca, commissioner of the Vermont Department of Education

Entertainment

Actors

 Ana de Armas, Cuban-born
 Anabelle Acosta, Cuban-born American actress (Ballers and Quantico)
Laz Alonso, actor
 Tyler Alvarez, actor (Every Witch Way, American Vandal)
Odette Annable, actress (Cloverfield); Cuban mother
Desi Arnaz, actor and musician (I Love Lucy)
Desi Arnaz Jr., actor and musician 
Lucie Arnaz, actress and singer
Nelson Ascencio, comedian (MADtv)
 Omar Avila, actor
Ariana Barouk, TV host, actress, model, and singer; represented Cuba in the seventh edition of the environmentally oriented Miss Earth, international beauty pageant
Steven Bauer, actor (Scarface, ¿Qué Pasa, USA?, credited as Rocky Echevarría)
 Jason Canela, actor; brother of Jencarlos Canela
Maria Canals-Barrera, voice actress
Camilla Cabello, singer and composer
Isabella Castillo, actress and singer
Jencarlos Canela, actor (Mas sabe el diablo)
Bobby Cannavale, actor (Third Watch, Will & Grace), Cuban mother
Irene Cara, actress (Flashdance)
Nestor Carbonell, actor (Suddenly Susan, Lost, The Dark Knight, The Lost City)
Matt Cedeño, actor and model
Eddie Cibrian, actor (Vanished, Invasion)

Valerie Cruz, actress (Nip/Tuck, The Dresden Files)
Dar Dash, actor, voice actor, Cuban mother
Sammy Davis, Jr., actor, singer, dancer; mother was of mostly Cuban descent, though often reported as Puerto Rican
Rosario Dawson, American actress (Rent, Kids), mother of Puerto Rican and Afro-Cuban descent
 Anthony De La Torre, actor 
Kamar de los Reyes, soap opera actor (One Life to Live)
Bianca Del Rio, comedian, actor, drag performer (Hurricane Bianca)
 Cameron Diaz, actress (father was of Cuban descent)
Guillermo Díaz, actor (films Half Baked, Party Girl)
 Joey Diaz, actor and comedian
 Emiliano Díez, actor (the George Lopez TV series)
 Majandra Delfino, actress (Roswell)
 Marieh Delfino, actress
 Raúl Esparza, actor
 Gloria Estefan, singer and composer
 Lola Falana, actress and singer to an Afro-Cuban father.
 Mel Ferrer, actor
 Chrissie Fit, actor

Amber Frank, actor (The Haunted Hathaways, Spirit Riding Free)
Daisy Fuentes, model and television personality (MTV's House of Style)
David Fumero, soap opera actor (One Life to Live)
Gene Gabriel, actor (Numb3rs, Law & Order: Criminal Intent)
David Gallagher, actor, 7th Heaven, Cuban mother
Mo Gallini, actor (2 Fast 2 Furious)
Melissa Gallo, television actress, One Life to Live
Robert Gant, actor (Queer as Folk)
Andy García, Academy Award-nominated actor (The Godfather Part III, Ocean's Eleven, Oceans Twelve, The Lost City)
Joanna García, film and television actress (Reba)
Jorge Garcia, actor (Lost)
 Jsu Garcia, actor
 Jessica Marie Garcia, American actress of Cuban and Mexican descent (The Middle, Liv and Maddie, On My Block).  
Carlos Gómez, actor
Marga Gomez, comedian/playwright
Adam Irigoyen, actor (Shake It Up)
Oscar Isaac, actor (Inside Llewyn Davis, Star Wars: The Force Awakens) 
Blake Jenner, American actor and singer; mother is Cuban
David Lago, actor
 Stefania LaVie Owen (1997-) American actress to a Cuban mother (Running Wilde, The Carrie Diaries, Sweet Tooth)
 Paul Le Mat, American actor of partial Cuban descent
William Levy, actor
 Selenis Leyva (1972-) American actress of Cuban and Dominican descent (Orange Is the New Black, Diary of a Future President). 
Eric Lopez, actor most notable for his role as Blue Beetle in Young Justice
Josie Loren, actress
Faizon Love, actor, born Langston Faizon Santisima
Alicia Machado, actress, Miss Universe 1996
Natalie Martinez, actress (Sons of Tucson)
Ana Margarita Martínez-Casado, actress (El Super, ¿Qué Pasa, USA?)
Julio Oscar Mechoso, actor
Eva Mendes, actress (Hitch, 2 Fast 2 Furious)
Olga Merediz, actress and singer
Alano Miller, actor (Jane the Virgin, Underground, and Loving)
Christina Milian, singer and actress (Be Cool)
 Natalie Morales actress (The Middleman).
 Louisa Moritz, Cuban-American actress, real estate holder and former lawyer
Enrique Murciano, actor (Without a Trace)
 Carlos Navarro, American actor and radio personality 
Giovanni Niubo, Cuban-American actor
Oscar Nuñez, actor (The Office)
Luis Oquendo, actor (film, Guaguasi, ¿Qué Pasa, USA?)
Elizabeth Peña, actress (Rush Hour)
Danny Pino, actor (Cold Case)
Tony Plana, actor (Ugly Betty)
Carlos Ponce, actor and singer; born in Puerto Rico to Cuban immigrants
 Antonia Rey (1926 – 2019), Cuban-born American actress
Armando Riesco, actor (film Garden State)
Adam Rodríguez, actor (CSI: Miami), of Cuban and Puerto Rican descent
Génesis Rodríguez, actress (Dona Barbara, Dame Chocolate and Prisionera)
 Mel Rodriguez, actor (Getting On, The Last Man on Earth, On Becoming a God in Central Florida)
Cesar Romero, actor (The Joker on Batman (1960s TV series), Ocean's Eleven, Week-End in Havana)
Mercedes Ruehl, Academy Award-winning (The Fisher King) and Tony Award-winning actress, mother is of part Cuban descent
Caitlin Sanchez, actress (Dora the Explorer)
Marco Sanchez, actor
Saundra Santiago, actress (Miami Vice, The Sopranos)
Tessie Santiago, actress (Queen of Swords, Good Morning, Miami)
Bianca A. Santos, actress (The Fosters)
Cristina Saralegui, Hispanic talk show host
Jamie-Lynn Sigler, actress (The Sopranos), mother is of Cuban descent
 Charise Castro Smith, actor
Georg Stanford Brown, actor (Roots)
Lela Star, pornographic actress 
Bella Thorne, actress Shake It Up; father was of Cuban descent
Oscar Torre, actor and director (Hangover III, Cane, Ladrón que roba a ladrón)
Gina Torres, actress (The Matrix sequels, Firefly and Serenity)
Tammy Trull, American actress of Venezuelan and Cuban descent
Yul Vazquez, Cuban-born American actor and musician
Bob Vila, This Old House host
Jordi Vilasuso, actor (Guiding Light)

Cartoonists and animators
 Antonio Prohías, creator of Mad Magazines Spy vs Spy series
 Joe Quesada, comic book editor, writer producer and artist
 Michael Peraza, American animator, art director, conceptual artist and historian of animation, who has worked for The Walt Disney Company, Fox Features, and Warner Brothers. His parents were of Cuban origin.

Directors, screenwriters and producers
Ozzie Alfonso, TV director, writer, producer; directed Sesame Street in the 1970s; senior producer, writer, and director of 3-2-1 Contact in the 1980s; freelanced for many clients; adjunct college professor at St. John's University
 Elisa Marina Alvarado - American director of Mexican and Cuban descent
 Rafael Casal (born 1985), American writer, actor, producer, and showrunner. He is of Irish, Spanish, and Cuban descent.
Migdia Chinea, film director, writer, producer;(When it rains..., The Incredible Hulk)
Manny Coto, executive producer (24), writer (24, Star Trek: Enterprise)
René Echevarria, writer (Star Trek: The Next Generation, Star Trek: Deep Space Nine, Medium), co-creator of The 4400
Andy García, director (Lost City)
 Dany Garcia, film producer
Silvio Horta, creator and writer (Ugly Betty), writer (Urban Legends, Jake 2.0)
Leon Ichaso, director/screenwriter (El Super), director (Ali: An American Hero, Crossover Dreams, Piñero, El Cantante)
 Valentina L. Garza, writer and producer for The Simpsons
Joe Menendez, TV and film director (Ladrón que roba a ladrón, From Dusk Till Dawn: The Series, 12 Monkeys, Queen of the South)
Roberto Orci, executive producer (Star Trek, The Proposal) and writer (Transformers, Eagle Eye, Star Trek)
George A. Romero, American film director, screenwriter and editor (Night of the Living Dead, Dawn of the Dead), creator of the Living Dead film series; son of a Cuban-born father of Castilian Spanish parentage and a Lithuanian American mother
 Eduardo Sánchez, Cuban-born American director (The Blair Witch Project)
Amy Serrano, director, cimematographer, and writer (The Sugar Babies), producer of documentary films, poet

Fashion

 Luis Estevez, Cuban-born American fashion designer and costume designer
 Lazaro Hernandez, fashion designer; born in Miami
 Jorge Manuel, bridal fashion designer
 Narciso Rodriguez, fashion designer
 Yvette Prieto, model for designer Alexander Wang
 Isabel Toledo, former creative director for Anne Klein; designed Michelle Obama's first inauguration day dress

Musicians

Composers and/or bandleaders 
 Xavier Cugat, bandleader
 Arsenio Rodríguez (1911–1970), Cuban musician, composer and bandleader; born in Cuba, he died in United States, where he lived in the last years of his life
 Lucy Simon, American composer for the theatre and popular songs; known for the musical The Secret Garden; sister of Carly and Joanna Simon
 Ernesto Lecuona, composer, pianist

Producers 
 Desmond Child, American musician, songwriter, and producer; mother is Cuban songwriter Elena Casals
 Scott Herren, music producer; father is Catalan and mother is of Irish and Cuban descent
 Ray Martinez, American musician, music producer, songwriter, artist, disco music icon; Cuban American; Cuban mother and Puerto Rican father
 Rudy Pérez, Cuban composer and music producer
 Tonedeff, American rapper, producer, and singer-songwriter; Cuban mother and Colombian father

Musicians and singers by genre

Rock 
 Ariel Aparicio, rock musician
 Juan Croucier, rock bassist (Ratt, Dokken, Quiet Riot)
 Frank Ferrer, American rock drummer and session musician (Guns N' Roses)
 Johnny Goudie, rock musician
 Al Jourgensen, frontman of Ministry; born in La Habana, Cuba, to Cuban and Norwegian parents
 Nil Lara, rock musician
 Dave Lombardo, drummer of Slayer
 Courtney Love, actress and frontwoman of rock band Hole; great-grandmother was Cuban immigrant
 Paul S Masvidal, guitarist for metal band Cynic; born in Puerto Rico to Cuban parents
 Rudy Sarzo, rock bassist (Quiet Riot, Ozzy Osbourne, Whitesnake, Manic Eden, Dio)
 Tico Torres, drummer of Bon Jovi, singer
 Fernando Perdomo, guitarist featured in Echo In The Canyon

Latin American popular music 

 Camila Cabello,  singer and songwriter, former member of the girl group Fifth Harmony
 Gloria Estefan, 7-time Grammy-winning and Academy Award-nominated singer
 Emilio Estefan, 19-time Grammy-winning producer
 Franky Gee, member of German eurodance group Captain Jack; born in Cuba, of African American descent
 Erick Brian Colón, member of Latin boy band CNCO, born in Havana, Cuba
 Roberto Ledesma, singer

Rap and hip-hop 

B Real, member of rap group Cypress Hill; born Louis Freese; father is Mexican, mother is Cuban
Mellow Man Ace, "godfather of Latin hip hop"; born Ulpiano Sergio Reyes; Afro-Cuban
Olivia, born Olivia Longott; rapper; Cuban, Indian and Jamaican
P-Star, rapper, actress; born Priscilla Star Diaz
 Pitbull, Cuban American; born in Miami, Florida
Sen Dog, Cuban rapper, member of Cypress Hill
Fat Joe, American rapper; parents of Puerto rican and Cuban descent.
Kat Dahlia, rapper; Cuban and Lebanese
Cuban Link, Cuban rapper, original member of Terror Squad
Stitches, rapper; Cuban and Greek
Pouya, rapper; Cuban and Iranian

Percussionists 
 Francisco Aguabella, Afro-Cuban master percussionist
 Horacio Hernandez ("El Negro"), Grammy-winning drummer and percussionist
 Chano Pozo, Afro-Cuban, Latin Jazz percussionist, conga player
 Walfredo Reyes, Jr., percussionist and drum set player; born in Havana to a historically musical Cuban family; former member of Santana; current member of Chicago; expert in jazz, Latin, world music, world fusion, Afro-Cuban, and rock

Classical 
 Manuel Barrueco, classical guitarist
 Jorge Bolet, classical concert pianist specializing in Liszt
 Andrés Cárdenes, violinist
 José Curbelo (1917–2012), Cuban-born American pianist and manager
 Horacio Gutiérrez, prize-winning classical concert pianist
 Zenaida Manfugas, concert pianist
 Joanna Simon, mezzo-soprano; sister of Carly Simon
 René Touzet, composer, pianist
 Aurelio de la Vega, composer, music professor
 Yalil Guerra, composer, guitarist
 Tania León, composer, winner of a Pulitzer Prize for Music (2021)
 Marta Pérez, mezzo-soprano
 Elizabeth Caballero, lyric soprano

Jazz 
 Mario Bauza, trumpeter, saxophonist, composer, arranger, bandleader and Afro-Cuban Jazz pioneer
 Paquito D'Rivera, Grammy-winning saxophonist
 Machito, jazz singer and bandleader
 Fats Navarro (1923–1950), American jazz trumpet player; a pioneer of the bebop style of jazz improvisation in the 1940s; of Cuban-Black-Chinese descent
 Chico O'Farrill, jazz trumpeter; composer, arranger
 Arturo Sandoval, jazz trumpeter and pianist; composer
 Mongo Santamaría, Latin jazz musician Grammy winner
 Bebo Valdés, musician, composer

Pop, R&B, Folk, country and other music genre 
 Albita, Grammy-winning singer
Giselle Bellas, singer-songwriter
 Angela Bofill, American R&B and jazz singer and songwriter of Cuban and Puerto Rican descent
 Camila Cabello, singer, born in Havana, Cuba
 Nini Camps, Cuban-American folk rock singer-songwriter
 Irene Cara, Oscar and Grammy-winning singer (Flashdance), actress (Fame); born in the Bronx, New York; mother was American of Cuban descent
 Willy Chirino, singer
 Erick Brian Colon, born in Havana, Cuba; member of CNCO
 Celia Cruz, multiple Grammy-winning singer
 The DeCastro Sisters, singing group
 Addys D'Mercedes, singer
 Emily Estefan, singer-songwriter, musician
 Lola Falana, singer, actress and dancer
 Olga Guillot, singer
 Arawak Jah, international Cuban reggae star, member and founder of the reggae group Arawak Jah in Orlando, Florida
 Lauren Jauregui, Cuban-American singer, member of Fifth Harmony
Roberto Ledesma, singer
 Lissette, singer, actress; wife of Willy Chirino; daughter of Olga y Tony
 La Lupe, singer and gay icon
 Raúl Malo, lead singer of American country music band The Mavericks
 Martika, Grammy-nominated singer/actress (film Annie; television series Kids Incorporated)
 A. J. McLean, member of the Backstreet Boys; of Cuban and German ancestry on his mother's side
 Syesha Mercado, singer
 Roger Miret, singer for Agnostic Front
 Jorge Moreno, Grammy award-winning singer, writer and TV producer
 JD Natasha, Latin pop musician
 Nayer, American singer of Cuban parents
 Rey Ruiz, singer
 Jon Secada, two-time Grammy-winning singer
 Ponciano Seoane, pop singer and contestant from NBC's The Voice season 11
 Carly Simon, singer-songwriter, musician, and children's author; mother, Andrea Louise Simon,  was of German, French, and Afro-Cuban descent
 Malu Trevejo, singer, Instagram star
 Mayra Verónica, singer, model, television personality
 Voltaire, dark cabaret musician; born Aurelio Voltaire Hernández

Reality television contestants

Jose "Pepi" Diaz, contestant on season 5 of The Apprentice
Alexia Echevarria, cast member on The Real Housewives Of Miami
Marlon Fernández, winner of Objetivo Fama (third season)
 Janette Manrara, finalist, So You Think You Can Dance, Season 5
Jeanine Mason, winner of Season 5 of So You Think You Can Dance and actress
Ashley Massaro, Survivor: China contestant, WWE wrestler, Playboy model
Syesha Mercado, American Idol contestant
Chris Núñez, artist and reality television personality (Miami Ink)
Melissa Padrón, featured on The Real World: Miami
Veronica Portillo, Playboy model and Road Rules contestant
Peter Weber, featured as The Bachelor and as a contestant on The Bachelorette
Pedro Zamora, AIDS activist, featured on The Real World: San Francisco

Writers

Alex Abella, mystery/crime novelist, non-fiction writer, and journalist
Mercedes de Acosta, poet, playwright
Reynaldo Arenas, poet, author
Joaquín Badajoz, poet, author, essayist, member of the North American Academy of the Spanish Language
Richard Blanco, Spanish-born poet
Rafael Campo, Cuban-born American poet
Daína Chaviano, novelist, poet, and award-winning novelist of Azorín Prize for Best Novel (Spain), among other international awards. 
Nilo Cruz, playwright, the first Latino to win the Pulitzer Prize for Drama
 Silvia Curbelo, poet
Carmen Agra Deedy, children's books author
Carlos Eire, writer, won the 2003 National Book Award in Nonfiction
Frank Fernández, anarchist, author of exile-related themes
Roberto G. Fernández, novelist
María Irene Fornés, playwright
Paula Fox, author, winner of Hans Christian Andersen Medal, biological grandmother of musician Courtney Love
Cristina García, novelist
Carolina Garcia-Aguilera, mystery novelist and descendant of Cuban independence patriot Francisco Vicente Aguilera
Lucia M. Gonzalez, children's writer
Jorge Enrique González Pacheco www.jorgeenrique.net, poet, cultural entrepreneur, founder of the Seattle Latino Film Festival, a 501(c)(3) non profit organization
Lillian Guerra, Professor of History at University of Florida and widely published researcher and author
Oscar Hijuelos, first Hispanic to win the Pulitzer Prize for fiction

Robert Lima, author of twenty-seven books, poet, literary critic, biographer, editor, translator, bibliographer
Rosa Lowinger, author of Tropicana Nights: the Life and Times of the Legendary Cuban Nightclub
Ana Menéndez, author (books In Cuba I Was a German Shepherd and Loving Che)
Orlando Ricardo Menes, poet, short story writer, translator, anthologist
Anaïs Nin, author
Achy Obejas, novelist
Ricardo Pau-Llosa, poet, art critic
Gustavo Pérez Firmat, poet, writer, and scholar
Carlos Pintado, author, playwright and award-winning poet of Sant Jordi International Prize for Poetry 
Jorge Reyes, memoirist, short-story writer, poet, children's books
Enrique Ros, writer, scholar, activist, and father of Ileana Ros-Lehtinen
Antonio Sacre, children's books, playwright
Cecilia Samartin, novelist (books Broken Paradise, Tarnished Beauty, Vigil)
Luis Senarens, proto-science fiction author of the late 1800s.
Virgil Suárez, novelist
Piri Thomas, author (memoir Down These Mean Streets)
Alisa Valdes-Rodriguez, writer (The Dirty Girls Social Club)
Armando Valladares, writer (Against All Hope: A Memoir of Life in Castro's Gulag)

Others 
Judge Alex Ferrer
Judge Marilyn Milian
Lyle Menendez
Erik Menendez

Journalists

Jim Acosta, CNN's Senior White House Correspondent
Jessica Aguirre, anchor for KNTV NBC Bay Area News, San Francisco, California
Achy Obejas, novelist,  journalist
Manny Alvarez, medical correspondent for Fox News Channel
Cathy Areu, founder of Catalina magazine
Liz Balmaseda, columnist, Miami Herald
Bárbara Bermudo, anchor, Primer Impacto
 Michelle Caruso-Cabrera, business news general assignment reporter for CNBC television
Myrka Dellanos, former anchor, Primer Impacto
GiGi Diaz, sports reporter, Pompano Park, and journalist in Miami
Lili Estefan, host for Univision
Suzy Exposito, Los Angeles Times music reporter

Lourdes Garcia-Navarro, New York Times podcast host and former journalist for National Public Radio
Max Gomez, medical correspondent for WCBS-TV in New York City
Pedro Gomez, ESPN reporter
Ambrose E. Gonzales, co-founder of The State newspaper in South Carolina and author of several books in Gullah language
Narciso Gener Gonzales, co-founder of The State newspaper in South Carolina
 Maria Laria, journalist and presenter
Dan Le Batard, sportswriter for The Miami Herald
Tom Llamas, correspondent for ABC News
Antonio Mora, host on Al Jazeera America
Belkys Nerey, anchor WSVN, Fox in Miami
Jackie Nespral, anchor WTVJ, NBC in Miami
Soledad O'Brien, Al Jazeera America correspondent, independent producer
Mirta Ojito, Pulitzer Prize winner
Rafael Pineda, veteran TV personality, former anchor WXTV in New York City
Eliott Rodriguez, anchor for CBS Miami.
Ellie Rodriguez, anchor for WSVN in Miami
Maggie Rodriguez, co-anchor of CBS's The Early Show
Rick Sanchez, anchor
Kristen Millares Young, investigative journalist

Government

United States ambassadors

Eduardo Aguirre, former United States Ambassador to Spain and Andorra
Paul L. Cejas, former United States Ambassador to Belgium
Miguel H. Díaz, United States Ambassador to Holy See
Lino Gutierrez, former United States Ambassador to Argentina
Hugo Llorens, United States Ambassador to Honduras
Carlos Pascual, former United States Ambassador to Mexico
 Otto Reich, former United States Ambassador to Venezuela
Mauricio Solaún, former United States Ambassador to Nicaragua

United States Cabinet members

Carlos Gutierrez, former United States Secretary of Commerce (Republican)
Mel Martinez, former United States Secretary of Housing and Urban Development (Republican)
Alexander Acosta, former United States Secretary of Labor (Republican)
Alejandro Mayorkas, United States Secretary of Homeland Security (Democrat)

United States House of Representatives

Carlos Curbelo, Republican member of the United States House of Representatives, representing Florida's 26th district
Lincoln Díaz-Balart, Republican former member of the United States House of Representatives, representing Florida's 21st district
Mario Díaz-Balart, Republican member of the United States House of Representatives, representing Florida's 25th district
Joe Garcia, former Democratic member of the United States House of Representatives, representing Florida's 26th district
Carlos A. Giménez, Republican member-elect in the 2020 U.S. House of Representatives for Florida's 26th congressional district, former mayor of Miami-Dade County (2011-2020)
Thomas Ponce Gill, Congressman from Hawaii in the early 1960s (his paternal grandmother was Cuban)
 Anthony Gonzalez, Republican, Ohio's 16th District (2019–Present)
Joseph Marion Hernández, first Hispanic elected to the United States Congress
Nicole Malliotakis, Republican member-elect of the United States House of Representatives, representing New York's 11th district
Alex Mooney, Republican member of the United States House of Representatives, representing West Virginia's 2nd district 
David Rivera, Republican former member of the United States House of Representatives, representing Florida's 25th district
Ileana Ros-Lehtinen, Republican member of the United States House of Representatives, representing Florida's 18th district
Maria Elvira Salazar, Republican member-elect in the 2020 U.S. House of Representatives for Florida's 27th congressional district, former television news anchor
Albio Sires, Democratic member of the United States House of Representatives, representing New Jersey's 13th district

2008 Congressional candidates
Raul L. Martinez, Democratic candidate for Florida's 21st district

United States Senate

Ted Cruz, United States Senator (R–Texas)
Mel Martinez, former United States Senator (R-Florida)
Bob Menendez, United States Senator (D–New Jersey), and chairman of the Senate Foreign Relations Committee; former representative for New Jersey's 13th district
Marco Rubio, United States Senator (R-Florida)

Federal government

Al Cardenas, Washington, D.C. lobbyist
Alex Castellanos, Republican media consultant; senior advisor to 2008 Presidential Candidate Mitt Romney
Nils J. Diaz, former chairman of the Nuclear Regulatory Commission
Cari M. Dominguez, Chair of the United States Equal Employment Opportunity Commission
Emilio T. Gonzalez, Ph.D., director of United States Citizenship and Immigration Services (USCIS)
Eliot A. Jardines, first Assistant Deputy Director of National Intelligence for Open Source
Elsa A. Murano, former Undersecretary for Food Safety United States Department of Agriculture
Pedro Pablo Permuy, former Deputy Assistant Secretary of Defense
Steve Pieczenik, former Deputy Assistant Secretary of State
Otto Reich, former Assistant Secretary of State for Western Hemisphere Affairs
Mauricio J. Tamargo, 14th Chairman of the Foreign Claims Settlement Commission

Local government

Carlos Alvarez, former mayor of Miami-Dade County
Joe Carollo, former mayor of Miami
Manny Diaz, mayor of Miami
George Gascón, district attorney of Los Angeles County; former district attorney of San Francisco County
Carlos A. Giménez, 7th Mayor of Miami-Dade County
Rosario Kennedy, former commissioner and vice-mayor of Miami
Raul L. Martinez, former mayor of Hialeah
Carlos Mayans, former mayor of Wichita, Kansas
Gilda Oliveros, first Cuban-born woman mayor in the United States
Alex Penelas, former mayor (D–FL), Miami-Dade County, Florida
Tomas Regalado, former mayor of Miami
Julio Robaina, former mayor of City of Hialeah
Francis Suarez, mayor of Miami 
Xavier Suarez, former mayor of Miami
Silverio Vega, former mayor of West New York, New Jersey
 Bill Vidal, former mayor of Denver, Colorado; born in Camagüey, Cuba

State government

Zulima Farber, former Attorney General of New Jersey
Anitere Flores, Florida State Senator and former Florida State Representative, first Republican Hispanic woman to serve in both the Florida House and Senate since 1986
Bob Martinez, former governor of Florida, first Cuban-American governor in United States history
Robert E. Martinez, 8th Virginia Secretary of Transportation and deputy administrator of the United States Maritime Administration
Joseph Miró, Delaware state representative, president National Hispanic Caucus of State Legislators
Alex X. Mooney, member of the Maryland state senate representing District 3
Vincent Prieto, New Jersey State Assemblyman, 32nd District
Marco Rubio, U.S. Senator from Florida, and former Speaker of the Florida House of Representatives
Katherine Fernandez Rundle, State Attorney for Miami-Dade County
Yvanna Cancela, State Senator representing Nevada's 10th District 
Mo Denis, State Senator representing Nevada's 2nd District
Jason Miyares, member of the Virginia House of Delegates' 82nd district and Attorney General-elect of Virginia

U.S. Commonwealth government
Roberto Arango, Puerto Rico Senator

Judiciary

Armando Omar Bonilla, former Department of Justice official and nominee to the United States Court of Federal Claims
Barbara Lagoa, Justice on the Florida Supreme Court
Cecilia Altonaga, United States District Court Judge
Danny Boggs, Chief judge of the United States Court of Appeals for the Sixth Circuit in Cincinnati
Raoul G. Cantero, III, first Hispanic justice on the Florida Supreme Court
Adalberto Jordan, United States District Court Judge
Jorge Labarga, Chief Justice of the Florida Supreme Court
Jose L. Linares, United States District Court Judge of United States District Court for the District of New Jersey in Newark, New Jersey
Ariel A. Rodriguez, judge of New Jersey Appellate Division, acting Justice of the New Jersey Supreme Court
Joseph H. Rodriguez, United States District Court Judge of the United States District Court for the District of New Jersey in Camden, New Jersey
Eduardo Robreno, United States District Court Judge of the United States District Court for the Eastern District of Pennsylvania in Philadelphia
Esther Salas, United States District Court Judge of United States District Court for the District of New Jersey in Newark, New Jersey
Mauricio J. Tamargo, Chairman of the Foreign Claims Settlement Commission

United States Armed Forces

Adolfo Fernández Cavada, captain in the Union Army during the American Civil War who later served as Commander-in-Chief of the Cinco Villas during Cuba's Ten Year War
Federico Fernández Cavada, colonel in the Union Army during the American Civil War and later Commander-in-Chief of all the Cuban forces during Cuba's Ten Year War
Mercedes O. Cubria, lieutenant colonel in the U.S. Army; first Cuban-born female officer in the US Army
Julius Peter Garesché, lieutenant colonel in the Union Army who served as Chief of Staff, with the rank of Lieutenant Colonel to Maj. Gen. William S. Rosecrans
Ambrosio José Gonzales, colonel in the Confederate Army during the American Civil War
Erneido Oliva, major general; former deputy commander of the D.C. National Guard
Félix Rodríguez, U.S. Army helicopter pilot, former CIA officer known for his involvement in the Bay of Pigs Invasion and his involvement in the capture and interrogation of Che Guevara
Lola Sánchez, Confederate spy during the American Civil War; played an instrumental role in the Confederate victory in the Battle of Horse Landing
José Agustín Quintero, Cuban born Confederate diplomat to Mexico, based in Monterrey
Loreta Janeta Velazquez (1842 – c. 1902), aka Lieutenant Harry Buford, Cuban-born woman who claimed that she masqueraded as a male Confederate soldier during the American Civil War

World leaders
Consuelo Montagu, Duchess of Manchester
Maria Teresa, Grand Duchess of Luxembourg

Science and technology

Aida de Acosta, first female to fly a powered aircraft
Aristides Agramonte, physician, pathologist and bacteriologist
Luis Walter Alvarez, Nobel Prize-winning experimental physicist (his paternal grandfather immigrated from Spain to Cuba and then to the United States)
Serena M. Auñón, American physician, engineer, and NASA astronaut
Agustin Walfredo Castellanos, physician
Nils J. Diaz, former Chairman of the U.S. Nuclear Regulatory Commission
Isabel Pérez Farfante, carcinologist
Carlos Juan Finlay (1833–1915), Cuban physician and scientist recognized as a pioneer in yellow fever research
Gregg L. Friedman MD, Cuban physician and scientist
Maria Oliva-Hemker, Cuban-born American paediatrician
 Tony Silva, Cuban-born American aviculturist and ornithologist who has written many books and articles about parrots.
Albert Siu, internist and geriatrician at Mount Sinai Medical Center in New York City
Armando Simon, Cuban-born research psychologist and author of When Evolution Stops, which amended the Darwinian-Wallace theory of evolution.

Visual arts 

Mercedes de Acosta, socialite, author, best known for her affairs with Greta Garbo and Marlene Dietrich
Rita de Acosta Lydig, socialite
Jose Ramon Diaz Alejandro, painter
Henry Ballate, visual artist
Jose Bedia, visual artist
Cundo Bermúdez, painter
Adriano Buergo, painter
José Bernal, artist
Juana Borrero
Fernando Bujones, ballet dancer
Consuelo Castañeda, visual artist
Ana Albertina Delgado Álvarez, visual artist
Antonia Eiriz, painter
George Gomez, industrial designer, designer of video games, toys and pinball machines
Diana Guerrero-Maciá, visual artist
F. Lennox Campello, contemporary visual artist, art critic, writer
 Manuel Carbonell (1918–2011), one of the last of the Cuban master sculptors; lived and died in Florida 
Jose Manuel Carreño, award-winning ballet dancer, American Ballet Theatre
Humberto Castro, painter
Migdia Chinea, awarded film director/screenwriter/producer; member of the TV Academy of Arts and Sciences. 
Rafael Consuegra, sculptor and painter
 Emilio Cruz (1938–2004), American artist of African and Cuban descent; his work is held in several major museums in the United States
Alberto Cutié, priest and television host, EWTN, and a daily talk show on Telemundo Network
Emilio Falero, artist
Alina Fernández, radio personality, daughter and critic of Fidel Castro
Teresita Fernández, artist
Lourdes Gomez Franca, artist and poet
Coco Fusco, artist and writer
Agustin Gainza, artist
Ric Garcia, painter and printmaker
Juan Gonzalez, painter
Félix González-Torres, artist
Jose Acosta Hernandez, artist
Nestor Hernández, photographer
Dinorah de Jesús Rodriguez, experimental filmmaker
Emilio Hector Rodriguez, contemporary visual artist, abstraction, painter, photographer
Miguel Jorge, painter
Josignacio, abstract artist
Guerra de la Paz, Cuban-born American artist duo Alain Guerra and Neraldo de la Paz, who work in sculpture, installation and photography
Zoa Martinez, artist, designer and director
Ana Mendieta, performance artist, feminist
Maria Teresa Mestre, wife of Luxembourg's constitutional monarch Grand Duke Henri; her title is Grand Duchess
Maria Elena Milagro de Hoyos, woman at the center of the Carl Tanzler case

José María Mijares, painter
Adriano Nicot, painter
Javier Peres, contemporary art dealer
Dionisio Perkins, painter 
Henry Pollack, radio host of "Havana Rock"
Miguel Rodez, artist, curator
Jorge Rodriguez-Gerada, artist
Rocío Rodríguez, painter
Emilio Sánchez, contemporary art painter and lithographer
Scull twins, painters and sculptors
Baruj Salinas, Abstract Expressionist painter
Rafael Soriano
Mario Torroella, artist and architect
Pedro Vizcaíno
Consuelo Yznaga, wife of George Montagu, 8th Duke of Manchester

Others 

 Juanita Castro, sister of former Cuban Communist Party first secretary Fidel Castro and incumbent First Secretary Raúl Castro; has lived in the United States since 1964 and is a naturalized citizen
 Michelle Font, beauty queen who won Miss Washington USA and competed in the Miss USA pageant on April 11, 2008, at Planet Hollywood in Las Vegas, Nevada; of Cuban and Puerto Rican descent
 Joaquín "Jack" García, retired FBI agent who infiltrated the Gambino crime family
 X González, activist and advocate for gun control; survivor of the Stoneman Douglas High School shooting
 Vida Guerra, Cuban born-American glamour model
 Carlos Maza, born to Cuban immigrant parents. Political activist
 Emilio Núñez (1855–1922), soldier, dentist, and politician
 Ana María Polo, Cuban-born American lawyer and Hispanic television arbitrator on Caso Cerrado
 Manny Puig, Cuban-born wildlife entertainer
 Enrique Ros (1924–2013), Cuban-born businessman and activist opposed to Cuban president Fidel Castro
 Andrea Louise Simon, community leader
 Alfred-Maurice de Zayas, Cuban-born lawyer; writer; historian; expert in the field of human rights and international law; retired high-ranking United Nations official; peace activist; since 2012 the United Nations Independent Expert on the Promotion of a Democratic and Equitable International Order (also known as Special Rapporteur), appointed by the United Nations Human Rights Council
 Jose Battle, Cuban-born refugee whom was a police officer during the Batista regime. He was the founder and head of an organized crime syndicate known as the corporation, also referred to as the "Cuban Mafia". Battle controlled bolita rackets within the Cuban-American community.

References 

Lists of American people by ethnic or national origin
Americans
Lists of American people of Latin American descent
Lists of people by ethnicity